The eastern chestnut mouse (Pseudomys gracilicaudatus) is a species of rodent in the family Muridae. It is found only in Australia, along the eastern coast from northern Queensland and into New South Wales as far as Jervis Bay.

References

Pseudomys
Mammals of New South Wales
Mammals of Queensland
Rodents of Australia
Mammals described in 1845
Taxonomy articles created by Polbot